Otter Island may refer to:

Otter Island (Alaska), island near Saint Paul Island, Alaska
Otter Island (Ontario), island in Ontario, Canada
Otter Island (South Carolina), noted in American Civil War accounts
Otter Island (Wisconsin), island located in Wisconsin
Otter Island (Tangier Sound), island in Maryland
Otter Island (Scotland), island in Scotland
Otter Island, an island on Derwentwater in Cumbria, England